Samuel Cochran Mims, Jr. (November 27, 1880 - December 12, 1946) was a Mississippi state senator, representing the state's 36th district as a Democrat, from 1916 to 1920.

Biography 
Samuel Cochran Mims, Jr. was born on November 27, 1880, in Chulahoma, Marshall County, Mississippi. He was the son of Samuel Cochran Mims and Jessie (Thompson) Mims. Mims Sr. was a member of the Board of Supervisors of Marshall County. In 1892, his family moved to Byhalia, Mississippi. Mims Jr. then graduated from the University of Mississippi. He was admitted to the bar in 1909. He began practicing law after that. He served as the County Attorney of Marshall County from May 1910 to December 1915. In 1915, he was elected to the Mississippi State Senate for the 1916–1920 term, as one of the three senators representing the 36th district and the senator representing Marshall County in that district. Later, he resided in Grenada, Mississippi, where he continued to practice law. Mims died on December 12, 1946, and was buried in Woodlawn Cemetery in Grenada, Mississippi.

Personal life 
Mims married Virginia Stone in 1915. They had a son named Samuel Cochran Mims, III. Mims Jr's great-grandson, and Mims III's grandson, Sam C. Mims V, also served in the Mississippi State Legislature.

References 

1880 births
1946 deaths
People from Holly Springs, Mississippi
Democratic Party Mississippi state senators
People from Byhalia, Mississippi
Place of death missing